Crosseola favosa is a species of minute sea snail or micromollusc, a marine gastropod mollusc in the family Conradiidae.

Description
The height of the shell attains 1.65 mm, its diameter 1.4 mm.

Distribution
This species is endemic to Three Kings Islands, New Zealand.

References

 Powell A. W. B., New Zealand Mollusca, William Collins Publishers Ltd, Auckland, New Zealand 1979 
 List of Mollusca collected; Discovery Reports v.15 (1937); Institute of Oceanographic Sciences (Great Britain)
 New Zealand Mollusca: Crosseola favosa

favosa
Gastropods of New Zealand
Gastropods described in 1937